Crossotus capucinus is a species of beetle in the family Cerambycidae. It was described by Carl Eduard Adolph Gerstaecker in 1884.

References

capucinus
Beetles described in 1884